Burgruine Hohenwart is a ruined castle south of the village of Köstenberg in Carinthia, Austria.

See also
List of castles in Austria

References
This article was initially translated from the German Wikipedia.

Castles in Carinthia (state)